Pietro Paolo Gerardi (1633–1708) was a Roman Catholic prelate who served as Bishop of Anagni (1696–1708).

He was born in Rome, Italy. He was ordained a deacon on 15 April 1696 and ordained a priest on 23 April 1696. On 21 May 1696, he was appointed during the papacy of Pope Innocent XII as Bishop of Anagni. On 3 June 1696, he was consecrated bishop by Bandino Panciatici, Cardinal-Priest of San Pancrazio, with Prospero Bottini, Titular Archbishop of Myra, and Sperello Sperelli, Bishop of Terni, serving as co-consecrators. He served as Bishop of Anagni until his death on 31 May 1708.

While bishop, Gerardi was the principal co-consecrator of Giovanbattista Carafa, Bishop of Nocera de' Pagani (1700).

References

External links and additional sources
 (for Chronology of Bishops) 
 (for Chronology of Bishops) 

17th-century Italian Roman Catholic bishops
18th-century Italian Roman Catholic bishops
Bishops appointed by Pope Innocent XII
1633 births
1708 deaths